The 2022 U.S. Women's Open Presented by ProMedica was the 77th U.S. Women's Open, held June 2 to June 5 at the Pine Needles Lodge and Golf Club in Southern Pines, North Carolina. Minjee Lee won the second of her two major titles, four strokes ahead of runner-up Mina Harigae. Ingrid Lindblad finished leading amateur at tied 11th. She beat the amateur scoring records over 18, 36 and 54 holes and tied the 72-hole amateur record in the tournament.

Pine Needles previously hosted the championship in 1996, 2001, and 2007, becoming the first course to host the tournament four times.

Venue

Course layout

Yardage by round

Field
The field for the U.S. Women's Open is made up of players who gain entry through qualifying events and those who are exempt from qualifying. The exemption criteria include provision for recent major champions, winners of major amateur events, and leading players in the Women's World Golf Rankings.

Exemptions
This list details the exemption criteria for the 2022 U.S. Women's Open and the players who qualified under them; any additional criteria under which players are exempt is indicated in parentheses.

1. Recent winners of the U.S. Women's Open (2012–2021)

Choi Na-yeon
Chun In-gee (9,15)
Ariya Jutanugarn (2,9,15)
Kim A-lim (15)
Brittany Lang
Lee Jeong-eun (9,15)
Yuka Saso (2,9,15)
Park Sung-hyun (6)
Michelle Wie West

Inbee Park (2,9,15) did not play.

2. The leading ten players, and those tying for tenth place, in the 2021 U.S. Women's Open

Nasa Hataoka (9,10,15)
Brooke Henderson (10,14,15)
Megan Khang (15)
Ko Jin-young (5,7,9,10,14,15)
Lin Xiyu (14,15)
Lexi Thompson (9,15)
Angel Yin

Shanshan Feng (15) did not play.

3. The winner of the 2021 U.S. Women's Amateur

Jenson Castle (a)

4. The winner of the 2021 U.S. Girls' Junior and 2021 U.S. Women's Mid-Amateur, and finalist from the 2021 U.S. Women's Amateur 

 Rose Zhang (a, 13)
 Blakesly Brock (a)
Hou Yu-chiang

5. Recent winners of the Chevron Championship (2018–2022)

Jennifer Kupcho (9,10,14,15)
Mirim Lee 
Pernilla Lindberg
Patty Tavatanakit (9,15)

6. Recent winners of the Women's PGA Championship (2018–2021)

Hannah Green (9,15)
Kim Sei-young (9,15)
Nelly Korda (9,10,15,17)

7. Recent winners of Evian Championship (2017–2019, 2021)

Minjee Lee (9,10,15)
Anna Nordqvist (8,9,10,15)
Angela Stanford

8. Recent winners of Women’s British Open (2017–2021)

Georgia Hall (9,15)
In-Kyung Kim
Sophia Popov (15)
Hinako Shibuno (15)

9. The leading 30 players from the 2021 LPGA Race to the CME Globe final points standings

Pajaree Anannarukarn (10,15)
Céline Boutier (10,14,15)
Matilda Castren (10,15)
Ally Ewing (15)
Moriya Jutanugarn (15)
Danielle Kang (10,14,15)
Kim Hyo-joo (15)
Lydia Ko (10,14,15)
Jessica Korda (15)
Leona Maguire (10,14,15)
Ryu So-yeon (15)
Lizette Salas (15)

Austin Ernst (15) did not play.

10. Winners of LPGA Tour sanctioned event between 2021 U.S. Women's Open and start of 2022 championship

Marina Alex (15)
Ji Eun-hee
Nanna Koerstz Madsen (14,15)
Ryann O'Toole (15)
Atthaya Thitikul (14,15)

11. The winner of the 2022 Augusta National Women's Amateur

Anna Davis (a)

12. The winner of the 2021 Womens Amateur Championship

Louise Duncan (a)

13. The winner of the Mark H. McCormack Medal in 2021

14. The leading 10 players on the 2022 Race to CME Globe points standings as of April 6, 2022

15. The leading 75 players on the Women's World Golf Rankings as of April 6, 2022

Brittany Altomare
Na Rin An
Pia Babnik
Choi Hye-jin
Carlota Ciganda
Ayaka Furue 
Mina Harigae
Charley Hull
Sakura Kowai
Alison Lee
Lee So-mi
Stacy Lewis 
Gaby López
Caroline Masson
Yuna Nishimura
Yealimi Noh 
Amy Olson
Mel Reid
Ryu Hae-ran
Madelene Sagström 
Mao Saigo
Ai Suzuki
Momoko Ueda
Amy Yang

Bae Seon Woo, Kitone Hori, Minami Katsu, Jang Ha-na, Mone Inami, Lee Da-yeon, Lim Hee-jeong, Park Hyun-kyung, Park Min-ji and Jiyai Shin did not play.

16. The leading 75 players on the Women's World Golf Rankings not otherwise exempt as of May 16, 2022

Maja Stark

Yoon Ina, Lee Gae-young, and Sayaka Takahashi did not play.

17. The winner of the 2020 Olympic Gold Medal

18. The winner of the 2021 U.S. Senior Women's Open

Annika Sörenstam

19. The leading player from the China LPGA Tour order of merit not otherwise exempt as of April 6, 2022

Liu Wenbo

20. Special exemptions

Qualifying

Alternates who gained entry
The following players gained a place in the field having finished as the leading alternates in the specified final qualifying events:
Dottie Ardina (Fort Myers)
Allisen Corpuz (Columbus)
Allison Emrey (Southern Pines)
Jillian Hollis (Aurora)
Karissa Kilby (a, Honolulu)
Lauren Kim (a, Kent)
Kim Min-sol (a, Incheon)
Andrea Lee (Pauma Valley)
Ingrid Lindblad (a, Hockley)
Park Boh-yun (a, Richardson)
Pornanong Phatlum (Morristown)
Lilia Vu (St. Louis)
Britney Yada (Scottsdale)

Round summaries

First round
Thursday, June 2, 2022

Second round
Friday, June 3, 2022

Source:

Third round
Saturday, June 4, 2022

Source:

Fourth round
Sunday, June 5, 2022

Source:

Notes

References

External links

U.S. Women's Open
Golf in North Carolina
Women's sports in North Carolina
Sports competitions in North Carolina
U.S. Women's Open
U.S. Women's Open
U.S. Women's Open
U.S. Women's Open